Saikan (斎館, Saikan) is a sprawling temple lodging atop Mt. Haguro (羽黒山 Haguro-san), part of the Three Mountains of Dewa (出羽三山 Dewa Sanzan) in Yamagata Prefecture, Japan.

It connects directly to the main temple of the complex through a long passageway that climbs further up the mountain. Elaborate Gohonbo Bassho-zen meals are served to visitors. Traditionally, it is reached by climbing up 2,466 stone steps up the side of the mountain, but it can also be reached by car or bus.

References

External links

Shinto shrines in Yamagata Prefecture